Stagecoach in Preston was a network of bus routes running within the city of Preston, Lancashire and into the surrounding area. It was founded in 2009 after Stagecoach Group acquired Preston Bus that was founded in 1904. The company operated from the main depot on Deepdale Road and their other depot on Selbourne Street. In January 2011, the company was sold to Rotala, which now operates the services under the Preston Bus brand.

History
Preston Bus was founded in 1904 as Preston District Travel and was bought from the local authority by its employees in 1993 as part of deregulation, becoming a limited company.

In 2006, Stagecoach North West set up various services using a fleet of new & old Optare Solos, Dennis Enviro 400s, and new & old Dennis Dart SLFs in order to compete with Preston Bus. They were branded as "Preston Citi". Competition grew into a bus war with Stagecoach offering lower fares on the busiest routes. 

Both companies accused each other of unprofessional behaviour, with some Stagecoach drivers reported to have thrown eggs at Preston Buses.

On 10 June 2008, both companies were agreed to a code of practice by the traffic commissioner. Competition continued, with Stagecoach operating routes within Preston and Preston Bus operating a route between Preston and Penwortham.

On 30 December 2008, it was announced that Stagecoach had approached Preston Bus to negotiate a possible sale. This was agreed and on 23 January 2009 Stagecoach North West purchased Preston Bus for £10.4 million. From March 2009, the combined network of routes was rebranded as Stagecoach in Preston.

On 28 May 2009, the Office of Fair Trading announced that it was referring the purchase of Preston Bus by Stagecoach to the Competition Commission. Their provisional findings were that the purchase had reduced competition and may potentially harm the interests of passengers. Possible remedies involved the sale of part or all of the business and measures to encourage new entry by other operators, as well as controls on fares and requirements to maintain service levels. The final report was due by 12 November 2009.

On 12 November 2009, the Competition Commission submitted that Stagecoach would have to sell a "reconfigured" (i.e. profit making) Preston Bus. Stagecoach had some freedom over what it sells, although it had to be approved by the Competition Commission.

Stagecoach appealed to the Competition Appeal Tribunal, stating that the Competition Commission's decision was "perverse and irrational" and that the Commission had committed an error in law with its use of the counterfactual argument and handling of Stagecoach's responses.

When the Competition Appeal Tribunal announced their verdict, Stagecoach began actively looking for a buyer. The result was that Stagecoach retained route 11. Things reverted to how they were before the takeover, with services transferring between Stagecoach and Preston Bus. Service 7 was withdrawn, and service 4 revised among other changes. Services 19, 22 & 8 reverted from giving change to fast fare. The 19-22 system was replaced by the original system operated by Preston Bus, and smaller buses were now used on the 19.

From the moment the Competition Commission announced it was investigating, Stagecoach stopped repainting buses out of Preston Bus livery. Some of those that were painted in Stagecoach colours were later returned to Preston Bus livery before the sale.

In January 2011, the company was sold to Rotala, which now operates the services under the Preston Bus brand.

Routes
Below are the routes operated by Stagecoach in Preston in March 2010:

Preston park and ride

All park and ride buses are Easy Access. Services 1 & 2 primarily use Optare Solo SRs, and Optare Solos are additionally used at peak periods. The Orbits are 88A & 88C and therefore use Optare Solos.

School services
Stagecoach in Preston also provided school buses to secondary school and colleges in Preston and the Wyre, running as far as Cabus and Garstang to the north, Accrington to the east, Chorley to the south, and Blackpool to the west.

Brands

Stagecoach in Preston had 6 different brands for services.

 Preston Citi - 1, 2, 3, 3A, 3B, 7, 8, 9, 11, 14, 16, 19, 19A, 22, 23, 29, 31, 35, 44, 81, 87, 89
 Preston Orbit - 88A, 88C
 Fylde Coastliner - 61, 68
 Stagecoach Express - X61
 Boomerang - 150, 151
 Route 113 - 113
 X2 - X2
 Park & Ride - 1 Portway, 2 Walton-le-Dale, Orbit serves Bluebell Way 
 Others - 2B, X59

Depots
Stagecoach in Preston used two depots. 

The main depot was the one previously owned by Preston Bus, on Deepdale Road. This could hold over 150 buses and held all buses in Preston Bus Livery, Citi Livery, and Stagecoach in Preston livery. 

A smaller depot was on Selbourne Street. This held buses in the liveries of Fylde Coastliner, Network Ribble Valley, 113, Boomerang, and those still in Stagecoach in Lancashire livery. It was also where the outstations at Fleetwood and Clitheroe reported to. This was previously owned by Stagecoach in Lancashire, and before that Ribble Motor Services. Before 2005 this had been rated as one of the worst Stagecoach depots in the UK for timekeeping, because at the time it mainly relied on interurbans.

Fleet

At Stagecoach Takeover
The Preston Bus fleet was originally all double deckers, but latterly the company moved to single deckers and midibuses, with the most common vehicle as of 2008 being the Optare Solo midibus. 

When Stagecoach took over Preston Bus in 2009, the fleet comprised

 47 Optare Solo midibuses bought between 2001 & 2009.
 8 Optare Solo SR midibuses with leather seats and television screens bought in 2008 for Park & Ride services.
 6 Optare MetroRiders dating from 1997.
 4 Leyland Lynx bought between 1989 and 1991. 
 12 Scania large single-deckers/Optare Esteem bought between 2006 and 2007.  
 1 DAF SB220/Optare Delta Driver Trainer
 27 Leyland Olympian double deckers, one new in 1984, the others bought between 1989 and 1992, except for ten examples purchased from Lothian Buses in 2003. 
 18 Dennis Trident 2/East Lancs Lolyne double deckers, bought between 1999 and 2000. 
 2 Scania N94UD OmniDekka, bought in 2006.

When sold to Rotala
When Preston Bus was sold to Rotala in January 2011, the fleet comprised:

 34 Optare Solo midibuses bought between 2001 and 2009.
 8 Optare Solo SR midibuses with leather seats and television screens bought in 2008 for Park & Ride services. All in Preston Park & Ride livery.
 1 Leyland Lynx
 10 Scania large single-deckers/Optare Esteem bought between 2006 and 2007.  
 1 DAF SB220/Optare Delta Driver Trainer
 13 Leyland Olympian
 18 Dennis Trident 2/East Lancs Lolyne double deckers, bought between 1999 and 2000. 
 2 Scania N94UD OmniDekka, bought in 2006.

Easy Access Bus
The majority of buses in the Stagecoach in Preston fleet are Easy Accessible. Optare Solos, Dennis Tridents, Optare Esteems, Optare Solo SRs, Optare Versas, MANs, Enviro 400s, and Dennis Dart SLFs are all Easy Access. Services 2, 2B, 3, 3A, 3B, 4, 8, 9, 11, 14, 16, 19, 19A, 22, 23, 29, 35, 44, 68, 81, Orbits, 113, 150, 151, and X2 are all completely Easy Access. All the others except service 89 are often Easy Access. Service 7 has specified times that aren't Easy access, four times a day.

See also
List of bus operators of the United Kingdom

References

External links

Preston Bus website

Stagecoach Group bus operators in England
Bus wars
Former bus operators in Lancashire